Eun-bi is a Korean feminine given name. There are 26 hanja with the reading "eun" on the South Korean government's official list of hanja which may be used in given names, among them "silver" and "grace", whereas "bi" is an indigenous Korean word meaning "rain" and is not written using hanja.

Baek Eun-bi (born 1979), South Korean speed skater
Jessica Hyun-ju Ho (born 1988), American singer who used the stage name Eunbi during the show Hangout with You
Lee Eun-bi (born 1990), South Korean team handball player
Cheon Eun-bi (born 1992), South Korean field hockey player
Kwon Eun-bi (born 1995), South Korean singer, former  member of girl group Iz*One
Jung Eun-bi (born 1997), South Korean female singer, member of girl group GFriend
Hwang Eun-bi (born 1998), South Korean female singer, member of girl group GFriend

Fictional characters with this name include:
Go Eun-bi, in 2011 South Korean television series The Musical
Yang Eun-bi, in 2011 South Korean television series Flower Boy Ramen Shop
Jo Eun-bi, in 2014 South Korean television series Reset
Lee Eun-bi, in 2015 South Korean television series School 2015

See also
List of Korean given names

References

Korean feminine given names